Alexander Mathias Munter (born April 29, 1968) is the President and Chief Executive Officer (CEO) of the Children's Hospital of Eastern Ontario (CHEO), and a former elected official and business owner in Ottawa, Ontario, Canada.

Advocacy 

Throughout his career, Munter has been at the forefront of numerous social change initiatives.

In 2001, as head of the city of Ottawa's Health and Social Services Committee, he led the adoption of Canada's first big-city workplace and public place smoking ban on city council. The Ottawa by-law became a model for many other jurisdictions, including New York City, which invited Munter to present to its city health commission in 2002. While second-hand smoke prohibitions are now commonplace, Ottawa's regulations broke new ground and came only a few years after Toronto had been forced to repeal a similar by-law due to public protest.

In 2003, Munter was approached by Canadians for Equal Marriage, a coalition of churches, professional groups and citizen organizations, and was asked to be the group's National Co-ordinator. In that role, he led a successful national campaign in support of Bill C-38: Civil Marriage Act, the federal legislation to entrench same-sex marriage rights in Canadian law.

In October 2011, Munter was named the next CEO of the Children's Hospital of Eastern Ontario] (CHEO) replacing Michel Bilodeau who retired from CHEO after a 30-year career in health administration.

Since moving into health and social services administration in 2007, Munter has continued to be a national voice on important public policy issues like gene patenting, obesity, mental health and the future of health care.

In 2014, Munter spoke for the Children's Hospital of Eastern Ontario (CHEO) when the organization launched a lawsuit against a private company, Transgenomic, challenging the legality of gene patents in Federal Court in Canada. CHEO argued that genes and other segments of the human genome should not be subject to patents for commercial purposes. CHEO declared victory in 2016, when it secured the right to use the disputed genes for all public hospitals and non-profit labs and created a public access framework that could be replicated for other genes. Munter called it "a historic day for Canada and Canada's health care system."

In 2012, Munter was appointed co-chair of a provincial expert panel on childhood obesity. Its 2013 report proposed a three-pronged strategy to reduce rates of childhood obesity: putting kids on the path to lifelong health, changing the food environment and building healthier communities. Recommendations included baby-friendly hospitals, better support for breastfeeding and restrictions on the marketing of junk food to children.

Munter has also been a vocal advocate of improved access to mental health care and to champion the adoption of innovative technologies within Canadian hospitals, as well as is a frequent speaker on the future of Canada's universal medicare system.

Career
Munter's father emigrated from Germany to Montreal in 1966, his mother had arrived the year before. They met in a French class for immigrants, which his mother was teaching.  His family then moved to the Ottawa region in 1977, and settled in the Katimavik-Hazeldean area west of the city. At age 14, Munter began publishing the Kanata Kourier from his basement as a monthly local paper for the suburban community of Kanata, Ontario. In four years, the paper had a staff of seven and a circulation of 10,000 in the town of 27,000. In recognition of his success in business, he received an award as "Young Entrepreneur of the Year" from then-Prime Minister Brian Mulroney in 1988.

Munter was a City and Regional Councillor in Ottawa from 1991 to 2003. From 1997 onward, he headed the council committees responsible for health and social services with oversight of the city's $550 million human services budget. In that role, he led Council to adopt unanimously pioneering smoke-free regulations in 2001; helped open new child care centres, expand the number of child care spaces, and expand public health programs for children and youth; worked with provincial government to oversee the transfer of ambulance services and social housing to the municipal level; initiated Canada's first comprehensive public access defibrillator program; expanded long-term care for seniors; funded hospital expansions and worked with the Community Care Access Centre and community support agencies to improve at-home support services for seniors and people with disabilities.

In 2012 and 2013, Munter served as co-chair of the Ontario Healthy Kids Panel along with Kelly Murumets, president and CEO of ParticipACTION. The final report recommended starting kids on the right path from conception to birth, changing the food environment, and creating healthier communities.

Munter was Executive Director of the Youth Services Bureau of Ottawa (YSB), one of Ontario largest accredited children's mental health agencies. He was also the Chief Executive Officer of the Champlain Local Health Integration Network (LHIN), the provincial government agency responsible for planning, integrating and funding health services in the Ottawa Region with an annual budget of $2.2 billion.

Munter holds a Bachelor of Social Sciences degree from the University of Ottawa, a Master of Science degree in Behavioural Science from the London School of Economics and a professional designation as a Certified Health Executive (CHE) from the Canadian College of Health Leaders. After leaving city government, he was a Visiting Professor in the School of Political Studies at the University of Ottawa, teaching there and at Montreal's Concordia University.

Politics 
Munter became much involved in local politics in his role as editor of the Kanata Kourier. He was frequently at odds with Kanata Mayor Des Adam. In August 1989, he sold his paper to Runge Newspapers Inc. for over $300,000 due to competition from the rival paper Kanata Standard, but stayed on as publisher. In November 1989, Munter left the Kourier to focus on his ongoing studies in Political Science at the University of Ottawa.

He became a political reporter for the Ottawa Citizen, but left to run as a candidate of the Ontario New Democratic Party in the 1990 provincial election, contesting the riding of Carleton. Munter placed third in this conservative riding, but received more votes than any previous NDP candidate in the area.

Munter briefly returned to the Citizen, then worked for the Spicer Commission on Canada's Future before re-entering politics to run for Kanata City Council against incumbent Bev Read. After winning the election, Munter quickly became a prominent member of the council. He pushed through an initiative to install condom dispensers in some municipal buildings. He also chaired the Kanata Police Services Board.

In 1993, he came out of the closet as the Ottawa area's first openly gay politician.

The following year, he ran for a seat on the Regional Municipality of Ottawa-Carleton representing all of Kanata. He easily won the seat against two other Kanata politicians.

During his time in office, Kanata was in the midst of an economic boom centred on the high-tech industry. Munter's main concern was managing the area's rapid growth. He supported creating the amalgamated city of Ottawa, and was acclaimed to the new Ottawa City Council when it was created.

He also chaired the new city of Ottawa's health committee and, along with Medical Officer of Health Robert Cushman, worked to bring in Ottawa's no-smoking by-law.

Munter was courted to run provincially or to challenge for the mayoralty against Bob Chiarelli in 2003, but instead took a hiatus from electoral politics. He became a visiting professor of Urban Studies and Communications at the University of Ottawa and resumed writing for the Citizen. The federal New Democratic Party (NDP) approached him to run in Ottawa Centre in the 2006 federal election to succeed Ed Broadbent but Munter declined. Munter was the co-ordinator for Canadians for Equal Marriage, a group that campaigned successfully in favour of legislation to enshrine same-sex marriage in Canada.

Munter is not a member of any political party now. Locally, the Ottawa Sun reported Munter campaigned for candidates from all the major parties including Conservative, Liberal, and NDP.

On February 13, 2006, Alex Munter announced his candidacy for mayor of Ottawa in the November 2006 municipal election. A 2005 poll by the Ottawa Sun had Munter as a front-runner, in a statistical tie with the incumbent Bob Chiarelli. Another public poll in April 2006 had Munter as the front runner with a significant lead over Chiarelli.  Most polls made public in the early stages of the campaign showed Munter in first place, often by a small margin. A poll conducted between October 13 and 18 by UniMarketing and sponsored by Radio-Canada and Le Droit, had Munter ahead by 12 percentage points at 44% of decided voters. Larry O'Brien was in second place with 32% and Chiarelli third (24%).

On election night, Munter finished second with 36.25%, behind O'Brien (47%) but ahead of Chiarelli (15.6%).

2006 mayoral campaign platform

Munter set out several key priorities in his mayor campaign: public safety, fiscal responsibility, local economy and public transit. He promised to limit tax hikes to the inflation rate. While he was a city councillor, he claimed he helped to bring in ten consecutive balanced budgets without any tax increases. His opponents claimed that the budget was balanced despite his votes to increase spending.

He said he planned to improve public transit in the city of Ottawa, to review the O-Train project and to fix possible irregularities regarding the contract with Siemens. Munter said that the project could have been significantly better than the existing proposal, and that the costs could have been reduced. He did his own proposal of the north–south line by proposing the removal of the Barrhaven and downtown sections. Funding released would have redirected for the development of a future east–west line.

He criticized outgoing mayor Bob Chiarelli on several occasions for proceeding too quickly on the project, without proper information and consultation. He also criticized the mayor for allegedly providing incorrect information about the project, including saying that there would be additional costs because of an announcement made by John Baird, President of the Treasury Board, that the federal government's $200 million contribution would be delayed until after the November election. After Larry O'Brien's election as the new mayor, the expansion project was completely cancelled by City Council on December 14, 2006.

He promised to improve safety on the city streets with an increase of the number of police officers. He supported, along with mayors from other cities, increased gun control and stricter measures for drug dealing. He also proposed to give an easier access to leisure activities for kids with lower recreational fees. He wanted the city of Ottawa to be environmentally friendly. In addition to improvements for the public transit system, he also promised to close two landfill sites situated on Carp and Navan Roads in which there were expansion requests by private firms despite opposition by citizens.

Awards 

Munter has won numerous awards from a wide range of organizations for his contributions to the community, including the Centre for Addiction and Mental Health, the Canadian Institute for Child Health, United Way/Centraide Ottawa, the Federal Business Development Bank, l'Association Canadienne-Française de l'Ontario d'Ottawa, Leadership Ottawa and the Ontario Association of Social Workers.

Electoral record

References

1968 births
Living people
Activists from Montreal
Anglophone Quebec people
Gay politicians
LGBT municipal councillors in Canada
Ottawa city councillors
Canadian people of German descent
Canadian newspaper editors
Journalists from Montreal
Journalists from Ontario
LGBT Christians
University of Ottawa alumni
Politicians from Montreal
Canadian LGBT rights activists
Ottawa-Carleton regional councillors
Canadian newspaper journalists
Canadian male journalists
Academic staff of the University of Ottawa
Canadian chief executives
Ontario New Democratic Party candidates in Ontario provincial elections
21st-century Canadian LGBT people
Canadian gay men
20th-century Canadian LGBT people
20th-century Canadian politicians
21st-century Canadian politicians